The 1954–55 Mexican Segunda División was the fifth season of the Mexican Segunda División. The season started on 9 August 1954 and concluded on 8 May 1955. It was won by Atlas.

Changes 
 Irapuato F.C. was promoted to Primera División.
 Atlas F.C. was relegated from Primera División.
 UNAM, Laguna, Celaya, IPN and Independiente Toluca entered the league.
 Estrella Roja and Moctezuma de Orizaba have dissolved.
 Oviedo Pachuca was put on hiatus for the 1954–55 season.

Teams

League table

Results

Promotion Playoff 
For the 1955-56 season it was decided to expand the First Division from 12 to 14 teams. A promotion consisting of five clubs was organized: 2 from the First Division and 3 from the Second. The classified teams were: Atlante and Marte from Primera División and Cuautla, Zamora and Querétaro from Second Division. Atlante remained at the First Division, Zamora and Cuautla were promoted. Marte was relegated to Segunda División and Querétaro remained at the same league.

References 

1954–55 in Mexican football
Segunda División de México seasons